Ai is a Japanese and Chinese given name.

In Japanese, it is almost always used as a feminine Japanese given name, written as あい in hiragana, アイ in katakana, 愛, 藍 or 亜衣 in kanji. It could mean love, affection (愛), or indigo (藍). The kanji 亜衣 is only associated as a proper noun, it could mean Asian clothes.

In Chinese, it is commonly used as a feminine given name, but it also is given as a male name, written as "爱/愛", "艾" or other characters. It could mean love, affection (愛), or mugwort (艾).

Notable people from Japan with the name

Athletes
, Japanese table tennis player.
 Ai Fukuhara (福原 愛), Japanese professional table tennis player.
 Ai Miyazato (宮里藍, born 1985), Japanese professional golf player.
 Ai Otomo (大友 愛), Japanese volleyball player.
 Ai Sugiyama (杉山愛, born 1975), retired Japanese professional tennis player.
 Ai Shibata, (柴田 亜衣), Japanese professional swimmer.
 Ai Shishime, (志々目愛), Japanese professional judoka.
 Ai Ogura, (小椋 藍, born 2001), Japanese male motorcycle racer.

Singers
 Ai (singer) (植村 愛 カリーナ, born 1981), Japanese-American singer and songwriter.
 Ai Kago (加護 亜依, born 1988), Japanese pop singer, actress, author and former member of J-pop group Morning Musume.
 Ai Kawashima (川嶋 あい), Japanese pop singer, songwriter and pianist.
 Ai Otsuka (大塚 愛, born 1982), Japanese pop singer, songwriter, pianist, composer, and actress.
 Ai Takahashi (高橋 愛, born 1986), Japanese pop singer and former member of Morning Musume.
, Japanese singer-songwriter.

Voice actresses
 Ai Furihata (降幡 愛), born 1994
 Ai Kakuma (加隈 亜衣), born 1988
 Ai Kayano (茅野 愛衣) born 1987
 Ai Kobayashi (小林 愛), born 1973 
 Ai Maeda (前田 愛), born 1975
 Ai Nagano (永野 愛), born 1974
 Ai Nonaka (野中 藍), born 1981
 Ai Orikasa (折笠 愛), born 1963
 Ai Shimizu (清水 愛), born 1981, also a singer and professional wrestler
 Fairouz Ai Kadota (門田 ファイルーズあい), born 1993, Japanese-Egyptian voice actress

Other
 Ai Iijima (飯島 愛, 1972 – 2008), Japanese media personality, writer, and actress.
, Japanese shogi player.
 Ai Haruna (はるな 愛), Japanese TV personality and singer.
 Ai Hashimoto (橋本 愛), Japanese actress and model.
 Ai Iwamura (岩村愛), Japanese actress.
 Ai Kato (加藤 あい), Japanese actress and model.
 Ai Kidosaki (城戸崎 愛, 1925–2020), Japanese chef.
, Japanese lawyer.
 Ai Kuwabara, Japanese jazz pianist.
 Ai Maeda (actress) (前田 愛), Japanese model, actress, and singer.
 Ai Morinaga (森永あい), Japanese manga artist.
, Japanese model and actress.
 Ai Ogawa (愛小川, 1947–2010) American poet.
 Ai Shinozaki (gravure idol) (篠崎 愛), Japanese singer, gravure idol, and actress.
 Ai Takabe (高部 あい), Japanese actress and voice actress.
 Ai Tominaga (冨永 愛), Japanese fashion model and actress.
 Ai Weiwei, Chinese artist and activist.
 Ai Yazawa (矢沢あい), Japanese manga author.

Mythical and fictional
 Ai (Aria), a character in the anime series Aria.
 Ai (Digimon Tamers), a character in the anime series Digimon Tamers.
 Ai (DokiDoki! PreCure), a character in the anime series DokiDoki! PreCure.
 Ai (Tick! Tack!), a character in the visual novel Tick! Tack!.
Ai, a character in Darling In The FranXX.
 Ai Amano, the main character in the manga and anime series Video Girl Ai.
 Ai Doruyoshi , character in Yandere Simulator 
 Ai Enma, the main character of the anime and manga Hell Girl.
 Ai Haibara a.k.a. Shiho Miyano, a character in Detective Conan.
 Ai Mori, a character in The Law of Ueki.
 Ai Nakashima, a sister is Makoto Nakashima and character in Haikyū!!
 Ai Shindou, a character in the anime and light novel series Beyond the Boundary.
 Ai Tanabe, a character in Planetes.
 Ai Yazawa, a character in Battle Royale II: Requiem.
 Ai, the female protagonist of the SNK Playmore fighting game Neo Geo Battle Coliseum.
 Ai, one of the main characters in the anime and eroge game Popotan.
 Ai Mikami, a character in the manga and anime series Future Diary.
 Ai Doruyashi, a rival in the video game Yandere Simulator
 Ai Ebihara, a character in Persona 4.
 Ai, the main character in Dōbutsu no Mori (film).
 Ai Myoujin, the Fighter of the Breathless team in the anime Loveless.
 Ai Nanasaki, a character in Amagami SS (Anime) and the game Amagami.
 T-AI or Ai-chan, a character in Transformers: Robots in Disguise.
 Ai, a character in InuYasha the Movie 4: Fire on the Mystic Island.
 Ai Fuyuumi, a character in Oreshura.
 Ai Mikaze, a character in Uta no Prince-sama.
 , a character in the media project Nijigasaki High School Idol Club
Ai Mizuno, a character from the MAPPA idol anime series Zombie Land Saga.
 Wang Ai Ling, a character in the Chinese Lilo & Stitch spin-off series Stitch & Ai.
 Ai Kaga, a character in the manga/anime series Sayonara Zetsubō Sensei
 Ai Coleman, a character from Dorohedoro.
 Kizuna AI, Japanese Virtual YouTuber and channel host.
 Ai Hayasaka, a character in the anime and manga series Kaguya-sama wa Kokurasetai.

Notable people from China with the name

Philosophy
Xu Ai was a Chinese philosopher during the mid-late Ming Dynasty.

Sports
Zhang Ai is a female Chinese softball player.

References

Japanese feminine given names
Chinese feminine given names